The Kanawha River Valley AVA is an American Viticultural Area located in the watershed of the Kanawha River in West Virginia, between the city of Charleston and the Ohio border.  The wine appellation includes  in portions of Cabell, Jackson, Kanawha, Mason, and Putnam counties.  A portion of the western border of the AVA follows the Ohio River, but does not cross into Ohio.  The Kanawha River Valley AVA is part of the much larger Ohio River Valley AVA. The hardiness zone is mainly 6b.

References 

American Viticultural Areas
Geography of Cabell County, West Virginia
Geography of Jackson County, West Virginia
Geography of Kanawha County, West Virginia
Kanawha River
Geography of Mason County, West Virginia
Geography of Putnam County, West Virginia
West Virginia wine